Angus is an unincorporated community in Seneca County, in the U.S. state of Ohio.

History
Angus was founded in 1883 by J. W. Angus when the railroad was extended to that point. A post office was established at Angus in 1883, and remained in operation until 1902.

References

Unincorporated communities in Seneca County, Ohio
Unincorporated communities in Ohio